Current River Township is an inactive township in Ripley County, in the U.S. state of Missouri.

Current River Township takes its name from the Current River.

References

Townships in Missouri
Townships in Ripley County, Missouri